The breakfast burrito, sometimes referred to as a breakfast wrap outside of the American Southwest, is a variety of American breakfast composed of breakfast items wrapped inside a flour tortilla burrito. This style was invented and popularized in several regional American cuisines, most notably originating in New Mexican cuisine, and expanding beyond Southwestern cuisine and neighboring  Tex-Mex. Southwestern-style breakfast burritos may include any combination of scrambled eggs, potatoes, cheese, peppers (usually New Mexico chile, Jalapeño, or other chili peppers), salsa, onions, chorizo, bacon, or sour cream.  In other variations of breakfast burritos, more ingredients such as tomatoes, cheese, ham, and other fresh products can be added.

Some fast food restaurants such as Burger King, Dunkin' Donuts, McDonald's and Taco Bell sell breakfast burritos. The breakfast burrito is also a popular street food, and street-style breakfast burritos are found in the food truck scene in places such as Los Angeles.

History
Tia Sophia's, a New Mexican diner in Santa Fe, claims the first use of the term "breakfast burrito" on a menu, in 1975, although a rolled tortilla containing some combination of eggs, bacon, potatoes, and cheese existed in New Mexican cuisine well before that.  Fast food giant McDonald's introduced their version in the late 1980s, and by the 1990s, more fast food restaurants caught on to the style, with Sonic Drive-In, Hardee's, and Carl's Jr. offering breakfast burritos on their menus. In 2014, Taco Bell launched their breakfast menu, which included breakfast burritos.

Preparation
The breakfast burrito can be prepared with myriad filling ingredients, such as eggs, ham, cheese, onion, chile or bell peppers, bacon, Canadian bacon, potatoes, sausage, avocado, tomato, spinach, beans, and olives.  In New Mexico, breakfast burritos are often served "smothered" (covered with a chile sauce) or "handheld" (with chile sauce or chopped green chile inside). It is usually served heated up or cooked.

See also

 Breakfast sandwich
 Breakfast taco
 Breakfast roll
 List of American foods
 List of breakfast foods
 Omelette
 Wrap (sandwich)

References

External links
 

Tortilla-based dishes
New Mexican cuisine
Street food in the United States
American breakfast foods